Jonathan Koffa (born May 14, 1981), known professionally as Takun J (often stylized as Takun-J), is a Liberian rapper, songwriter and activist. He is regarded as one of the pioneers of hipco, a politically-charged music genre. The Liberian Gender Ministry designated him as one of its anti-rape ambassadors. Takun J's music addresses socio-political issues in Liberia. He is best known for his singles "Who Make You Cry", "Policeman", "Gbagba is Corruption" and "A Song for Hawa". Takun J released his debut studio album The Time in 2007. His second studio album, titled My Way, was released in December 2012.

Biography and music career
Takun J was born in Monrovia, Liberia. He grew up with his mother and three siblings. His father relocated to the United States when he was four years old. He was present during Liberia's first and second civil wars, which lasted from 1989 to 2003. While growing up in the country's capital, he played soccer and participated in dancing and talent show competitions. He became passionate about music and decided to pursue a career in music after graduating from high school. When he was 17 years old, he joined a musical group called Magnetic. Takun J released his debut single "We'll Spay You" in 2005. His second single "You Meaning Me" was released the following year.

Takun J relocated to refugee camps in Ghana and Ivory Coast with his family during the Liberian civil wars. He returned to Liberia and released his debut album The Time in 2007. The album's lead single "Policeman" is a politically-charged song that exposes corruption by officers of the Liberian National Police; the song also includes a plea to then-President Ellen Johnson Sirleaf to repress corruption. The song's release prompted two police arrests and a beating. Takun J was not deterred by the incident and managed to perform on the day of his release from jail. In an interview with the Liberian Listener, Takun J said he released "Policeman" in order to create awareness about police negligence.

Takun J was one of the acts featured on the remix of Xpolay's 2012 single "Pot Not Bolling"; the song was produced by Yor-EL Francis and received critical acclaim in Liberia. In the aforementioned interview with the Liberian Listener, Takun J said the song was well received because of its positive messages. Takun J released his second studio album, titled My Way, in December 2012. Recorded at Studio 57 and Red Eyez studios, the album's production was handled by Stone Gray, AB Swaray, King Brian and Rawlo. It features guest contributions from Nasseman, Santos, Soul Smiter, Bentman tha Don, Scientific, Marvalous and Ice Princess. Takun J addresses his daily struggles on the record and said the songs on it are relatable.

In February 2013, Takun J released the solemn track "A Song for Hawa"; it was produced by PCI-Media Impact and addresses violence against Liberian girls and women. Takun J wrote the song after visiting a home sheltering victimized young girls. The music video for the song premiered at the UN Commission on the Status of Women. He told Mae Azango it narrates the story of a girl named Hawa, who was raped by her uncle following the death of her mother. Takun J has cited Tupac Shakur, Bob Marley and Akon as his key musical influences. He is part of the Hipco Accountability Network, an organization that strengthens copyright laws and establishes minimum play laws in Liberia. The network includes musical personalities such as Nasseman, JD Donzo, Shining Man, JB of Soul Fresh, Lil Bishop, Dr. C, Santos, Blackest 305, Uncle Shaq, Picardor and Pochano. 

In 2020, Takun J collaborated with DenG, Sundaygar Dearboy, Tan Tan, Soul Smiter, Odemz, and Amaze to produce the hipco song "Sanitize". The artists released the song in order to raise awareness about Covid-19 and encourage Liberians to practice good hygiene.

Humanitarian works

Anti-child rape campaign
Takun J became an ambassador for the Liberian Gender Ministry's anti-rape campaign, and was responsible for highlighting rape issues in the country. In order to galvanize communities to take action against violence towards children, UNICEF and PCI-Media Impact organized a series of six concerts, which was part of an expansive campaign to halt the abuse and exploitation of children in Liberia. On June 14, 2014, Takun J headlined the first concert held in the capital of Grand Bassa County; the concert featured additional performances from Peaches, Robbie Nas and comedian Kpakala Kpokolo, as well as a moving video highlighting the issue of child rape.

Anti-corruption campaign
On May 19, 2014, Takun J released  "Gbagba is Corruption", a conscious song that is based on the children's book Gbagba (2013). The book was written by Robtel Neajai Pailey, a former doctoral student at SOAS, University of London. Pailey was inspired to write the book in order to give children the verbal tools to question the ethical and moral values of adults around them. The book received critical acclaim and has been adopted as an anti-corruption children's primer by the Liberian Ministry of Education.

Notable performances and endorsement deals
Takun J performs at the annual two-day Hipco festival in Monrovia. On July 27, 2012, he performed with Nasseman, David Mell, Nozi and Mr. Smith at the Lone Star Cell musical concert. On December 7, 2013, he also performed at the second annual Liberia Music Festival, held at Slipway Sports Pitch. On March 15, 2014, Takun J performed at the Holiday Beach Jam in Congo Town alongside J. Martins, R2Bees, Scientific, Cypha D’King, Sweetz and F.A. He works with UNICEF as an ambassador of music. In March 2014, The Daily Observer reported that Takun J signed a two-year endorsement deal with Lonestar Cell MTN. As part of the deal, he is expected to appear and perform on Lonestar Cell/MTN programs.

Physical altercation with Edwin Snowe
On June 17, 2013, Takun J had an encounter with Edwin Snowe after narrowly escaping a head-on collision with Snowe's vehicle. The incident between the two individuals occurred at the United Nations Drive toward the Mamba Point diplomatic community. Takun J said Snowe pulled him out of his car and punched him several times. Snowe confirmed the occurrence of the incident and admitted to punching Takun J. After the incident had died down, Takun J wrote a formal complaint to the House of Representatives of Liberia about the punches he received from Snowe.

Discography

Studio albums
 The Time (2007)
 My Way (2012)

Singles (partial)

Guest appearances

Awards and nominations

See also

 Music of Liberia
 List of Liberian musicians

References

External links

 
 Takun J at SoundCloud

1981 births
Living people
Liberian songwriters
Musicians from Monrovia
Liberian singers